The Jaguar XJ is a series of full-size luxury cars produced by British automobile manufacturer Jaguar Cars (becoming Jaguar Land Rover in 2013) from 1968 to 2019. It was produced across five basic platform generations (debuting in 1968, 1986, 1994, 2003 and 2009) with various updated derivatives of each. From 1970 it was Jaguar's flagship four door model. The original model was the last Jaguar saloon to have had the input of Sir William Lyons, the company's founder, and the model has been featured in countless media and high-profile appearances.

Series 1, 2 and 3 (1968–1992)
The first-generation of the XJ was produced for a total period of 24 years, with two major facelifts in 1973 and 1979.

Series 1 (1968–1973)

The XJ6, using the 2.8-litre and 4.2-litre straight-six cylinder versions of Jaguar's renowned XK engine, replaced most of Jaguar's saloons – which, in the 1960s, had expanded to four separate ranges. Apart from the engines, the front and rear suspensions carried over from previous models as well: the widest version of Jaguar's IRS unit from the Mark X, and the subframe-mounted independent front suspension first seen in the 1955 Mark 1, with new anti-dive geometry.

An upmarket version was marketed under the Daimler brand as the Daimler Sovereign, continuing the name from the Daimler version of the Jaguar 420.

The car was introduced in September 1968. Power-assisted steering and leather upholstery were standard on the 2.8 L De Luxe and 4.2 L models. Air conditioning was offered as an optional extra on the 4.2 L Daimler versions, which were launched in October 1969 in a series of television advertisements featuring Sir William. In these advertisements, he referred to the car as "the finest Jaguar ever". An unusual feature inherited from the Mark X and S-Type saloons was the twin fuel tanks, positioned on each side of the boot, and filled using two separately lockable filler caps: one on the top of each wing above the rear wheel arches. Preliminary reviews of the car were favourable, noting the effective brakes and good ride quality.

In March 1970 it was announced that the Borg-Warner Model 8 automatic transmission, which the XJ6 had featured since 1968, would be replaced on the 4.2-litre XJ6 with the Borg-Warner Model 12. The new transmission had three different forward positions accessed via the selector lever, which effectively enabled performance oriented drivers to hold lower ratios at higher revs to achieve better acceleration. "Greatly improved shift quality" was also claimed for the new system.

Around this time other, minor changes were made as well, such as moving the rear reflectors from beside to below the rear lights; on the interior the chrome gauge bezels were replaced with black ones, to cut down on distracting reflections.

In 1972, the option of a long-wheelbase version, providing a 4-inch increase in leg room for passengers on the rear seats, became available.

A high performance version called the XJ12 was announced in July 1972, featuring a simplified grille treatment, and powered by a Jaguar's 5.3 L V12 engine coupled to the Borg-Warner Model 12 transmission. At the time it was the only mass-produced 12-cylinder, four-door car in the world and, with a top speed of "around" , it was the "fastest full four-seater available in the world". Although it had been the manufacturer's intention from launch that the XJ would use the 12-cylinder engine its installation was nonetheless a tight fit, and providing adequate cooling had been a challenge for Jaguar's engineers.  Bonnet louvres such as those fitted on the 12-cylinder E Type were rejected and instead the XJ12 featured a complex "cross-flow" radiator divided into two separated horizontal sections supported with coolant feeder tanks at each end. The engine fan was geared to rotate at 1¼ times the speed of the engine, subject to a limiter which cut in at a fan speed of 1,700 rpm.  The fuel system incorporated a relief valve that returned fuel to the tank when pressure in the lines to the carburettors exceeded 1.5 psi, to reduce the risk of vapour locks occurring at the high operating temperatures, while the car's battery had its own thermostatically-controlled cooling fan.

3,228 Series 1 XJ12s were built. A badge-engineered version, the Daimler Double-Six, was introduced in 1972, reviving the Daimler model name of 1926–1938.

Series 2 (1973–1979)

The XJ line received a facelift in Autumn 1973 for the 1974 model year, thereafter known as the "Series II"; retrospectively the earlier cars were referred to as the "Series I". The 4.2 L XJ6 straight-6 engine (most popular in the United Kingdom) and the 5.3 L V12 XJ12 were continued with an addition of a  version of the XK engine available from 1975. The Series II and Series II coupé were the last Jaguar models with direct input by Sir William Lyons before his retirement.

Initially the Series II was offered with two wheelbases, but at the 1974 London Motor Show Jaguar announced the withdrawal of the standard wheelbase version: subsequent saloons all featured the extra 4 inches (10 cm) of passenger cabin length hitherto featured only on the long-wheelbase model. By this time, the first customer deliveries of the two-door coupe, which retained the shorter standard-wheelbase (and which had already been formally launched more than a year earlier) were only months away.

Series II cars are visually differentiated from their predecessors by raised front bumpers to meet US crash safety regulations, which necessitated a smaller grille, complemented by a discreet additional inlet directly below the bumper. The interior received a substantial update, including simplified heating and A/C systems to address criticisms of the complex and not very effective Series I systems.

In April 1975 the North American models got a slightly revised set of front bumpers which had rubber over-riders covering the full length of the bumper with embedded turn signals at each end, and the Zenith-Stromberg carburettors of the V12-powered cars were replaced by Bosch-Lucas electronic fuel injection. In 1978 the carburetors were similarly replaced with EFI in the 4.2 L 6-cylinder XJ6L.

In May 1977 it was announced that the automatic transmission used behind the 12-cylinder engine would be changed to General Motors' three-speed Turbo-Hydramatic 400 transmission, in place of the British-built Borg-Warner used hitherto.

The 1978 UK model range included the Jaguar XJ 3.4, XJ 4.2, XJ 5.3, Daimler Sovereign 4.2, Double-Six 5.3, Daimler Vanden Plas 4.2 and Double-Six Vanden Plas 5.3.

In New Zealand, knock-down kits of the Series II were assembled locally by the New Zealand Motor Corporation (NZMC) at their Nelson plant. In the last year of production in New Zealand (1978), a special 'SuperJag' (XJ6-SLE) model was produced which featured half leather, half dralon wide pleat seats, vinyl roof, chrome steel wheels and air conditioning as standard. New Zealand produced models featured speedometers in km/h, and the black vinyl mats sewn onto the carpets in the front footwells featured the British Leyland 'L' logo.

Though worldwide production of the Series II ended in 1979, a number were produced in Cape Town, South Africa until 1981.

A total of 91,227 Series II models were produced, of which 14,226 were fitted with the V12 engine.

Engines

Note: HP varies depending on emission standards imposed on particular vehicles

Production count

Short-Long wheelbase

XJ Coupé

A 9,378 car production run of two-door XJ coupés with a pillarless hardtop body called the XJ-C was built between 1975 and 1978. The car was originally shown at the London Motor Show in October 1973, but it subsequently became clear that it was not ready for production, and the economic troubles unfolding in the western world at that time seemed to have reduced any sense of urgency about producing and selling the cars: it was reported that problems with window sealing delayed production. XJ coupés finally started to emerge from Jaguar show-rooms some two years later. The coupé was based on the short-wheelbase version of the XJ. The coupé's elongated doors were made out of a lengthened standard XJ front door (the weld seams are clearly visible under the interior panels where two front door shells were grafted together with a single outer skin). A few XJ-C cars were modified by Lynx Cars and Avon into a convertible body style with a retractable canvas top, but this was not a factory product. Lynx conversions (16 in total) did benefit from powered tops. Both six and twelve-cylinder models were offered, 6,505 of the former and 1,873 of the latter were made. Even with the delay, these cars suffered from water leaks and wind noise. The delayed introduction, the labour-intensive work required by the modified saloon body, the higher price than the four-door car, and the early demise promulgated by the new XJ-S, all ensured a small production run.

All coupés came with a vinyl roof as standard. Since the coupé lacked B-pillars, the roof flexed enough that the paint used by Jaguar at the time would develop cracks. More modern paints do not suffer such problems, so when coupés are repainted it is advisable to remove the vinyl. Today many XJ-Cs thus no longer have their vinyl roof, which also minimises the threat of roof rust. Some owners also modified their XJ-C by changing to Series III bumpers. This lifted the front indicators from under the bumper and provided built in rear fog lights.

A small number of Daimler versions of the XJ-C were made. One prototype of the Daimler Vanden Plas XJ-C was also made, however this version never went into production.

Production Count

Series 3 (1979–1992)

The car was significantly facelifted again in April 1979, known as the "Series III", incorporating a subtle exterior redesign by Pininfarina. Changes from the Series II included thicker and more incorporated rubber bumpers with decorative chrome only on the top edge, flush door handles, one-piece front door glass without a separate quarter light, a grille with only vertical vanes, reverse lights moved from the boot plinth to the larger rear light clusters, and a revised roofline with narrower door frames and increased glass area. The option of a sunroof and cruise control were also offered for the first time.

The 5.3 L V12, 4.2 L and 3.4 L straight-six engines carried over from the Series II, with minor changes. The larger six-cylinder and V12 models incorporated Bosch fuel injection (made under licence by Lucas) while the smaller six-cylinder remained carburetted. The smaller six-cylinder engine was never offered in the US, and the V12 was no longer offered there after 1980.

The 1979 UK model range included the Jaguar XJ6 3.4 & 4.2, XJ12 5.3, Daimler Sovereign 4.2 & Double-Six 5.3 and Daimler Vanden Plas 4.2 & Double-Six Vanden Plas 5.3.

In 1981 the cylinder heads of the V12 engine were replaced by the new "Fireball" high-compression design by Swiss racing driver Michael May, and were badged from this time onwards to 1985 as "HE" (High Efficiency) models.

In late 1981 the Daimler Sovereign and Double Six models received a minor interior upgrade for the 1982 model year with features similar to Vanden Plas models. Also for the 1982 model year, a top spec "Jaguar" Vanden Plas model was introduced in the US market.

In late 1982 the interior of all Series III models underwent a minor update for the 1983 model year. A trip computer appeared for the first time and was fitted as standard on V12 models. A new and much sought-after alloy wheel featuring numerous distinctive circular holes was also introduced, commonly known as the "pepperpot" wheel. Pirelli tyres were also fitted as standard equipment.

For the 1984 model year the Sovereign name was transferred from the Daimler marque to a new top-specification Jaguar model, the "Jaguar Sovereign". A base Jaguar XJ12 was no longer available, with the V12 engine only being offered as a Jaguar Sovereign HE or Daimler Double Six. The Vanden Plas name was also dropped at the time in the UK market, due to Jaguar being split from British Leyland and privatised; the name was used on top-of-the-range Rover-branded cars. Daimler models became the Daimler 4.2 and Double Six and were the most luxurious XJ Series III models, being fully optioned with Vanden Plas spec interiors. The Vanden Plas trademark was retained by Jaguar in North America, and top-of-the-line XJs were still sold there with the Vanden Plas name.

The 1984 UK model range included the Jaguar XJ6 3.4 & 4.2, Sovereign 4.2 & 5.3, Daimler 4.2 & Double Six 5.3.

Production of the six-cylinder Series III XJs continued until early 1987, after which it was replaced by the all-new XJ40, while production of 12-cylinder Series III XJs continued until 1992. The last 100 cars built were numbered and sold in Canada as part of a special series commemorating the end of production. These 100 cars featured the option of having a brass plaque located in the cabin. It was the original purchaser's option to have this plaque, which also gave a number to the car (such as No. 5 of 100, etc.), fitted to the glove box, to the console woodwork or not fitted at all. This brass plaque initiative did not come from Jaguar in Coventry: it was a local effort by Jaguar Canada staff and the brass plaques were engraved locally.

132,952 Series III cars were built, 10,500 with the V12 engine. In total between 1968 and 1992 approximately 318,000 XJ6 and XJ12 cars were produced.

Technical specifications

XJ40, X300, and X308 (1986–2003)
The second generation of the XJ was produced for a total of 17 years with the arrival of the XJ40 in 1987 with its X300 and X308 derivatives being introduced later.

XJ40 (1986–1994)

The intended replacement for the Series XJ models was code-named XJ40, and development on the all-new car began in the early 1970s (with small scale models being built as early as 1972). The project suffered a number of delays due to problems at parent company British Leyland and events such as the
1973 oil crisis. The XJ40 was finally unveiled on 8 October 1986 at the British International Motor Show.

With the XJ40, Jaguar began to place more emphasis on build quality as well as simplification of the XJ's build process. With 25% fewer body panel pressings required versus the outgoing model, the new process also saved weight, increased the stiffness of the chassis, and reduced cabin noise.

The new platform came with significantly different styling, which was more squared-off and angular than the outgoing Series III. Individual round headlamps were replaced with rectangular units on the higher-specification cars, and all models came with only a single, wide-sweeping windshield wiper. The interior received several modernisations such as the switch to a digital instrument cluster (although this was eventually discontinued for the 1990 model year in favour of analogue instruments.)

The six-cylinder XJ40s are powered by the AJ6 inline-six engine, which replaced the XK6 unit used in earlier XJs. The new unit featured a four-valve, twin overhead cam design. In 1993, one year before XJ40 production ended, the V12-powered XJ12 and Daimler Double Six models were reintroduced.

X300 (1994–1997)

The X300, introduced in October 1994 at the Paris Motor Show, was stylistically intended to evoke the image of the more curvaceous Series XJ models. The front of the car was redesigned significantly to return to four individual round headlamps that provided definition to the sculptured bonnet. Mechanically, it was similar to the XJ40 that it replaced.

Six-cylinder X300 models are powered by the AJ16 inline-six engine, which is a further enhancement of the AJ6 engine that uses an electronic distributorless ignition system. The V12 remained available until the end of the X300 production in 1997 (although it ended one year earlier in the United States market due to problems meeting OBD-II-related emissions requirements.)

Jaguar first introduced the supercharged XJR model in the X300's production run; the first supercharged road car manufactured by the company.

Design of the X300 was directly affected by the Ford Motor Company's ownership of Jaguar (between 1990 and 2007). According to Automotive News, this was evident in general "product development processes", more than the use of Ford components. However, the X300's traction control system was obtained from the Ford Mondeo and it also featured a Nippondenso air conditioner purchased through Ford channels. In a Car and Driver's comparison test, it was stated that the X300 Jaguar XJ is less roomy than the E39 BMW 5 Series and W210 Mercedes-Benz E-Class despite being longer dimensionally.

X308 (1997–2003)

With the introduction of the X308 generation in 1997 came a switch from the XJ6 and XJ12 nomenclature to XJ8, reflecting the fact that the X308 cars were powered by a new V8 engine.

The exterior styling of the X308 is similar to the X300 with minor refinements. The biggest change in the appearance was the switch to a stylistically rounded design for all of the exterior lights, indicators and interior trim and fittings, including information displays and switches.  The interior was also updated to eliminate the rectangular instrument binnacle which had gone largely unchanged since the original XJ40; instead, three large gauges were set into recesses in the walnut-faced dashboard in front of the driver similar in design to the recently launched Jaguar XK (X100).

The major mechanical change was the replacement of both the inline-six and V12 engines with new eight-cylinder AJ-V8 in either a displacement of 3.2 L or 4.0 L, with the 4.0 L also available in supercharged form in the XJR (A sport oriented model). No manual transmission was available, and all X308 models were supplied with a five-speed automatic gearbox.

X350 and X358 (2003–2009)

XJ (X350) (2003–2007) 

In 2003, Jaguar introduced the re-engineered and newly designed third generation of the XJ, continuing with the XJ8 model designation. Designated internally as the X350, it has an all-aluminium body and chassis, a new V8 engine, as well as greater interior and luggage spaces. It was the first Jaguar XJ to be completely designed under Ford ownership and utilises electronics and computer-controlled systems sourced through existing partner suppliers or directly produced by Ford.

The V8 engine was offered in larger 3.5 and 4.2-litre displacements as well in a supercharged variation. A 3.0-litre V6 engine was also offered, (neither the V6 petrol nor diesel engines were available in US markets). A new six-speed automatic gearbox was fitted which was lighter and offered better economy with lock-up on all gears and a larger spread of ratios.

Air suspension was fitted at the front and rear, providing adaptive damping as well as rear self leveling— with computer-controlled ride height and suspension mode. Dynamic stability control as well as traction control were standard. Radar based adaptive cruise control was offered.

Two-zone climate control was also standard, with four-zone available on long-wheelbase models. An optional touch screen interface controlled default settings, satellite navigation, the Alpine audio system, and bluetooth telephone. "Jaguar Voice" offered voice control of many functions.

XJ (X358) (2007–2009)

A facelifted version of the X350 was launched at the end of February 2007 with a revised lower grille, prominent faux side air vents, small bootlid spoiler and revised seating.

X351 (2010–2019)

In July 2009, the redesigned XJ was unveiled at the Saatchi Gallery in London, with Jay Leno and Elle Macpherson unveiling the new car. The unveiling was broadcast live on the Jaguar website.

In keeping with Ian Callum's new design direction for Jaguar, the XJ has an all-new exterior design and a break from the XJ Series mould carried over on all previous generations. It is a longer, wider car that is much bigger than its predecessor. The front has clear links with the XF executive car, although with slimmer, sleeker lights and a larger, squarer grille add a more aggressive appearance. The rear is the contentious part, an unusual design element for a Jaguar automobile. The upright, swooping taillights, nicknamed "cat's claws", and black roof panels at each side of the rear screen, which aim to hide the XJ's width, are the most striking aspects. There is also a standard full-length sunroof, that extends all the way back with just a single body-coloured roof panel that the designer refers as bridges on yachts.

The new XJ features an innovative, all-LCD dashboard and console displays. The dashboard can be configured to display various virtual dials in addition to the obligatory speedometer. The console display presents different views to the driver and passenger, including control of a sophisticated video and audio system.

Like several of its predecessors, the X351 is available in both standard and long-wheelbase form, as well as many special editions. Engines are modern units already seen in other JLR products: the 5.0-litre petrol V8 either normally aspirated or supercharged, or a 3.0-litre diesel twin-turbocharged V6 that is predicted to account for most of the sales. For 2013, a 3.0-litre supercharged V6 was introduced to the line-up, primarily as an alternative to the diesel unit for improved fuel economy.

The X351 received a minor facelift in 2014, primarily upgrading the suspension and rear seat facilities on the long wheelbase versions, but also introducing small cosmetic changes across the range, and making stop-start technology standard on all engines.

The X351 received another facelift in 2015, adding LED headlights, J-Blade rear taillights, and adding several new driver assistance and safety features such as lane assist, adaptive cruise control with a new feature known as "Queue assist", reverse traffic direction, closing vehicle sensing, a 360 degree camera system, and semi-automated parking features.

The X351 is one of the cars used by the British royal family and an armoured version was used for transporting three former UK Prime Ministers namely David Cameron, Theresa May and Boris Johnson. The Prime Ministerial Car, aside from having classified security measures, has armoured under plates and engine plates.

Worldwide sales

Electric XJ (cancelled)

On 5 July 2019, Jaguar Land Rover confirmed that they intended to build an all-electric XJ luxury saloon car at their Castle Bromwich plant. The car was expected to be launched in 2020. First official images of new generation's taillights were shown. 

On 15 February 2021, Jaguar Land Rover announced that the all-electric XJ project had been shelved, as it was no longer part of the company's current vision. The company said: "Following a thorough technology review against the exponential change in the automotive industry, we concluded that the planned XJ replacement does not fit with our vision for a reimaged Jaguar brand."

XJ Numbering of cars and engines
Just prior to World War II, Jaguar, known then as SS Cars, started using a numbering system beginning with the letter X for internal projects.  X meaning experimental, XB for military chassis projects and XF to XK for engines.  This numbering system has never been consistent and there appear to be many omissions and duplications.

References

External links

 International Jaguar XJ Page
 USA Jaguar XJ Page
 MENA Jaguar XJ Page

XJ
Flagship vehicles
Full-size vehicles
Sedans
Rear-wheel-drive vehicles
Cars introduced in 1968
1970s cars
1980s cars
1990s cars
2000s cars
2010s cars
Limousines